The 1989 Sugar Bowl was the 55th edition of the college football bowl game, played at the Louisiana Superdome in New Orleans, Louisiana, on Monday, January 2. Part of the 1988–89 bowl game season, it featured the fourth-ranked independent Florida State Seminoles and the #7 Auburn Tigers of the Southeastern Conference (SEC). Favored Florida State won the defensive slugfest, 13–7.

Sponsored by the USF&G insurance company, the game was officially known as the USF&G Sugar Bowl. New Year's Day was on Sunday in 1989, and the college bowl games were played the following day.

Teams

Both teams entered the game with one loss.

Florida State

The Seminoles opened the season ranked first, but were shut out 31–0 at Miami in the opener and fell to tenth in the AP poll. They won the remainder of their games.

Auburn

The Tigers' only loss was by a point at LSU on October 8, and they fell from fourth to twelfth in the AP poll.

Game summary
The game kicked off shortly after 7:30 p.m. CST, following the Rose Bowl on ABC, and shortly after the start of the Orange Bowl on NBC. Played on Monday night, the broadcast team in the booth was from ABC's Monday Night Football.

Florida State played well on its first offensive possession, and running back Dayne Williams capped an 84-yard drive with a two-yard touchdown run. That would mark the only touchdown Florida State would score in the game. Auburn quarterback Reggie Slack's first pass of the game was intercepted by strong safety Stan Shiver at the Auburn 44-yard line. Florida State's four-play drive ended with a 25-yard Bill Mason field goal to put the score at 10–0 Florida State.

At the end of the first quarter, Florida State defensive back Dedrick Dodge intercepted a Reggie Slack pass at the Auburn 38-yard line and the succeeding drive Mason's second field goal of the game, a 31-yarder, more than three minutes into the second quarter, which was FSU's last score of the game. With 4:09 left in the first half, Reggie Slack threw a 20-yard touchdown pass to Walter Reeves, on a playaction pass,  making it Florida State 13–7, and neither team scored again.

The game was filled with several mistakes from Florida State. Running back Sammie Smith score on a 69-yard touchdown run was wiped out by a holding penalty. Despite the penalty, he would still finish the game with a game high 115 yards rushing. Florida State had first and goal at the Auburn 4-yard line, but came up empty after a fake field goal missed. These errors nearly cost Florida State the game.

With 3:30 left in the game, Auburn drove from its own 4-yard line to Florida State's 22-yard line. With five seconds left Reggie Slack's pass was intercepted in the end zone by Deion Sanders, sealing Florida State's win.

Scoring summary

Statistics
{| class=wikitable style="text-align:center"
! Statistics !! Florida State !! Auburn 
|-
|align=left|First Downs || 21 || 18
|-
|align=left|Rushes–yards|| 47–148|| 36–108
|-
|align=left|Passing yards || 157 || 162
|-
|align=left|Passes || 14–27–1 || 19–33–3
|-
|align=left|Total Offense || 74–305 || 69–270
|-
|align=left|Return yards || 11 || 38
|-
|align=left|Punts–average ||4–35.0|| 4–35.8
|-
|align=left|Fumbles–lost ||2–1|| 3–2
|-
|align=left|Turnovers||2||5
|-
|align=left|Penalties–yards ||6–45||5–65
|-
|align=left|Time of possession ||33:35 ||26:25
|}

Aftermath
Florida State climbed to third in the final AP poll and Auburn remained at seventh.

References

Sugar Bowl
Sugar Bowl
Auburn Tigers football bowl games
Florida State Seminoles football bowl games
Sugar Bowl
Sugar Bowl